Winter in America is a 1976 song by Doug Ashdown, written by him and Jimmy Stewart. It was released as a single and on his album Winter in America (Festival Records / Infinity 1976). The song was a Top 20 hit song in Australia and The Netherlands.

Lyrics

The lyrics are set in the United States during December and describe a man whose partner left him for another. He expresses his heartache and sadness, though also hopes she's happier with him.

Background

It was originally titled Leave Love Enough Alone and released in 1974, but failed to become a hit. Only when he retitled it as Winter in America in 1976 it became a hit song in Australia, reaching #14 in Melbourne and #30 in Sydney. In 1978 it also became a hit song in Belgium and the Netherlands.

Winter in America has been covered by Marco Bakker (1984), Gerard Cox (1987), René Froger (1988) and in Dutch by The Kik (2014) as December. Ashdown's original was also covered in 1994 by the Australian band The Robertson Brothers.

Sources

Australian folk songs
Australian pop songs
Songs about heartache
1974 songs
1974 singles
1976 singles